Mladen Stoicev (born 21 October 1995) is a Serbian football forward who plays for Jagodina.

References

External links
 
 Mladen Stoicev stats at utakmica.rs 
 

1995 births
Living people
Sportspeople from Niš
Association football forwards
Serbian footballers
FK Jagodina players
Serbian SuperLiga players